The 2018–19 Fortuna Düsseldorf season is the 124th season in the football club's history and 24th overall season in the top flight of German football, the Bundesliga, having been promoted from the 2. Bundesliga in 2018. In addition to the domestic league, Fortuna Düsseldorf also are participating in this season's edition of the domestic cup, the DFB-Pokal. This is the 15th season for Düsseldorf in the Merkur Spiel-Arena, located in Düsseldorf, North Rhine-Westphalia, Germany. The season covers a period from 1 July 2018 to 30 June 2019.

Players

Squad information

Friendly matches

Competitions

Overview

Bundesliga

League table

Results summary

Results by round

Matches

DFB-Pokal

Statistics

Appearances and goals

|-
! colspan=14 style=background:#dcdcdc; text-align:center| Goalkeepers

|-
! colspan=14 style=background:#dcdcdc; text-align:center| Defenders

|-
! colspan=14 style=background:#dcdcdc; text-align:center| Midfielders

|-
! colspan=14 style=background:#dcdcdc; text-align:center| Forwards

|-
! colspan=14 style=background:#dcdcdc; text-align:center| Players transferred out during the season

|-

References

Fortuna Düsseldorf seasons
Dusseldorf